Vanadzor City Stadium, is a multi-use stadium in Vanadzor, Armenia, currently used for football matches. Opened in 1958 as Lori Stadium with a capacity of 5,000 spectators, it served as home to Lori Vanadzor and FC Vanadzor.

Future plans
In October 2010, an agreement was achieved between the Vanadzor City Council and the Football Federation of Armenia to renovate the stadium, under the operation of the FFA. However, in August 2011, the Helsinki Citizens’ Assembly-Vanadzor Office appealed against the Vanadzor municipality to abolish the agreement. As a result of the appeal, the 2011-scheduled renovation with an envisaged cost of US dollars 3 million was abandoned.

Finally in December 2017, a major reconstruction process was launched to redevelop the venue and turn it into an all-seater stadium with a capacity of 4,000 seats. It is envisaged to have the project completed by the beginning of 2022. by the Vanadzor municipality until

References

Football venues in Armenia
Sport in Vanadzor
Buildings and structures in Vanadzor
Lori FC